Several acts passed by the United States Congress are known as the War Powers Act:
 the Trading with the Enemy Act of 1917

 the War Powers Act of 1941
 the War Powers Resolution of 1973